Tongue Thai'd (subtitled with Pangina Heals) is a talk show that premiered on December 6, 2022, through WOW Presents Plus. The talk show is hosted by Drag Race Thailand co-host and RuPaul's Drag Race: UK vs the World contestant, Pangina Heals.

Premise 
Every episode of the program features a guest from the Drag Race franchise and is presented by judging panelist Pangina Heals. They both get lunches at a Thai restaurant. Each Thai dish gets progressively hotter as they consume it. They both engage in entertaining challenges or mini-games while eating. After dining, Pangina tells the guest about their total score and the prizes they have won.

Background 
The production company, World of Wonder, announced their late 2022 programming for their streaming service, WOW Presents Plus. Many new series were revealed in a trailer, including Sketchy Queens, Bring Back My Girls, Muff Busters, and Tongue Thai'd. A trailer was released and showcased Pangina Heals presenting the show with many contestants from the Drag Race franchise eating Thai cuisine. The show started to premiere on December 6, with Jujubee as a guest.

Episodes

References 

2020s American LGBT-related television series
2022 American television series debuts
American LGBT-related reality television series
WOW Presents Plus original programming